William Henry Christman (October 1, 1844 – May 11, 1864) was the first soldier to be buried in Arlington National Cemetery.
Christman was a laborer from Pocono Lake, Pennsylvania. He enlisted in the Union Army for service during the American Civil War on March 25, 1864, serving in the 67th Pennsylvania Infantry Regiment. He was hospitalized for measles five weeks later, being admitted to Lincoln General Hospital on May 1, and died on May 11. He was interred in Arlington National Cemetery on May 13, 1864, the first Union soldier to be so interred.

References

External links
 The William Henry Christman Story

1844 births
1864 deaths
Burials at Arlington National Cemetery
Deaths from measles
Union Army soldiers
People of Pennsylvania in the American Civil War